is Ali Project's 22nd single. This single was released on November 19, 2008 under the Victor Entertainment label.

The single title was used as the opening theme for the anime series Linebarrels of Iron. This single garnered the #9 spot in the Oricon weekly charts and charted for 9 weeks.

This single's catalog number is VTCL-35050.

Track listing

Charts and sales

References

2008 singles
2008 songs
Ali Project songs
Victor Entertainment singles
Anime songs
Song articles with missing songwriters